Boloria epithore, the Pacific fritillary, is a butterfly of the family Nymphalidae. It is found in western North America from California to British Columbia and Alberta.

The butterfly flies from June to July.

The larvae feed on Viola ocellata.

Subspecies
The following subspecies are recognised:
B. e. chermocki E.M. Perkins & S.F. Perkins, 1966 (Oregon)
B. e. epithore (W.H. Edwards, 1864) (California)
B. e. sierra E.M. Perkins, 1973 (California)
B. e. uslui Koçak, 1984 (British Columbia)

References

External links

Pacific Fritillary, Butterflies and Moths of North America

Boloria
Butterflies of North America
Taxa named by William Henry Edwards
Butterflies described in 1864